Torill Kove (born 25 May 1958) is a Norwegian-born Canadian film director and animator. She won the 2007 Academy Award for Animated Short Film for the film The Danish Poet, co-produced by Norway's Mikrofilm AS and the National Film Board of Canada (NFB).

Life and career
Born in Hamar, in the south of Norway near Oslo, Kove has lived in Montreal, Quebec, Canada since 1982. She moved to Montreal to continue her academic studies in urban planning at Concordia University earning a master's degree (MUP '89) at McGill University later changing her major to animation.
 

Kove has previously stated that she in fact did not watch much animation until she was in her thirties. Unemployed in the fall of 1991, rather than look for work she spent time at the NFB's former public access facility on St. Denis Street, where every day she would watch films. "Two things happened as I was sifting through the NFB animation collection: one was excitement at having discovered such a wonderful treasure of films, and the other was a voice in me that said loud and clear 'I want to do this.'"

Her first Academy Award nomination was for My Grandmother Ironed the King's Shirts in 2000, inspired by the story of her own grandmother who had ironed the shirts of Norway's King Haakon VII for many years.

In 2013 she directed the Danish-Norwegian-Swedish animated feature Hocus Pocus Alfie Atkins, based on the Alfie Atkins books by Swedish children's book author Gunilla Bergström.

Kove's 2014 NFB animated short, Me and My Moulton, is an autobiographical film about a little girl’s desire to fit in, premiering at the 2014 Toronto International Film Festival.
It was then nominated for an Academy Award on January 15, 2015. Her films The Danish Poet and My Grandmother Ironed the King's Shirts were included in the Animation Show of Shows.

In February 2015, Kove stated that her next film would be based on her life in Montreal, specifically in the Shaughnessy Village neighbourhood. In May 2016, Kove stated on the NFB's blog that she was in production on a more minimalist film, Threads, inspired by her experiences as an adoptive parent:

In addition to directing and animating short films, she has also illustrated several children's books.

References

External links
Films by Kove at National Film Board of Canada (nfb.ca) 

1958 births
Canadian women film directors
Canadian children's book illustrators
Norwegian film directors
Norwegian women film directors
Norwegian animated film directors
Canadian animated film directors
Norwegian animators
Norwegian emigrants to Canada
Living people
Directors of Best Animated Short Academy Award winners
Concordia University alumni
People from Hamar
National Film Board of Canada people
Directors of Genie and Canadian Screen Award winners for Best Animated Short
Artists from Montreal
Film directors from Montreal
Norwegian women animators
Canadian women animators
McGill University alumni